Phacelia imbricata is a species of phacelia known by the common name imbricate phacelia. It is native to much of California and Baja California, where it can be found in varied habitat in mountains, desert, valleys, and coastline.

Description
Phacelia imbricata is a perennial herb growing decumbent or erect to a maximum height exceeding one meter. It is glandular and coated in stiff hairs. The leaves may be up to 15 centimeters long and are divided into several leaflets. The inflorescence is a one-sided curving or coiling cyme of many bell-shaped flowers. The flower is roughly half a centimeter long and white to pale purple in color.

External links
Jepson Manual Treatment - Phacelia imbricata
Phacelia imbricata - Photo gallery

imbricata
Flora of California
Flora of Baja California
Natural history of the California chaparral and woodlands
Flora of the Sierra Nevada (United States)
Natural history of the California Coast Ranges
Natural history of the Peninsular Ranges
Natural history of the San Francisco Bay Area
Natural history of the Santa Monica Mountains
Natural history of the Transverse Ranges
Flora without expected TNC conservation status